The following lists include extreme and significant points of the geography of South Korea.


Overall

Mainland Peninsula
The list below is the extreme points within South Korean mainland, which excludes all the island territories.

See also

Geography of South Korea
Extreme points of Asia
Extreme points of the Earth
Lists of extreme points

References

Geography of South Korea
South Korea